Progreso Lakes is a city in Hidalgo County, Texas. The population was 240 at the 2010 United States Census. The city, incorporated in 1979,  is centered on Lion and Moon Lakes, two resacas or ox-bow lakes.

Progreso Lakes is part of the McAllen–Edinburg–Mission and Reynosa–McAllen metropolitan areas. In addition, it shares the U.S.-Mexico border with the city of Nuevo Progreso, Tamaulipas.

Geography

Progreso Lakes is located at  (26.073384, –97.961371). It is situated along FM 1015 in southern Hidalgo County, approximately two miles south of Progreso and six miles south of Weslaco. 
 

The Progreso-Nuevo Progreso International Bridge over the Rio Grande connects the city with Nuevo Progreso, Tamaulipas in Mexico.

Demographics

2020 census

As of the 2020 United States census, there were 257 people, 90 households, and 79 families residing in the city.

2000 census
As of the census of 2000, there were 234 people, 83 households, and 68 families residing in the city. The population density was 111.4 people per square mile (43.0/km2). There were 88 housing units at an average density of 41.9 per square mile (16.2/km2). The racial makeup of the city was 97.86% White, 0.43% Asian, 1.71% from other races. Hispanic or Latino of any race were 39.74% of the population.

There were 83 households, out of which 33.7% had children under the age of 18 living with them, 73.5% were married couples living together, 6.0% had a female householder with no husband present, and 16.9% were non-families. 13.3% of all households were made up of individuals, and 4.8% had someone living alone who was 65 years of age or older. The average household size was 2.82 and the average family size was 3.13.

In the city, the population was spread out, with 24.8% under the age of 18, 5.6% from 18 to 24, 23.9% from 25 to 44, 27.4% from 45 to 64, and 18.4% who were 65 years of age or older. The median age was 43 years. For every 100 females, there were 95.0 males. For every 100 females age 18 and over, there were 91.3 males.

The median income for a household in the city was $68,125, and the median income for a family was $72,500. Males had a median income of $55,417 versus $28,125 for females. The per capita income for the city was $24,029. About 4.3% of families and 4.2% of the population were below the poverty line, including 3.3% of those under the age of eighteen and 8.1% of those 65 or over.

Education
Progreso Lakes is served by the Progreso Independent School District.

In addition, South Texas Independent School District operates magnet schools that serve the community.

References

Cities in Hidalgo County, Texas
Cities in Texas